Oidaematophorus nigrofuscus is a moth of the family Pterophoridae that is endemic to Venezuela. The type location is Páramo de Piedras blancas.

The forewings are dark brown and the markings are black‑brown at the costa and above the base of the cleft and in the first lobe. The hindwings are grey brown and the fringes are reddish grey brown. Adults are on wing in September.

References

Moths described in 1986
Pterophoridae of South America
Endemic fauna of Venezuela
Oidaematophorini
Moths of South America
Páramo fauna